Shiding District is a rural district in southern New Taipei City, Taiwan.

History
Shiding used to be a thriving town during the Qing Dynasty due to its geographically favorable condition as a resting place on the way to Yilan and its coal mine resources and tea trading. Shiding was a rural township of Taipei County until the upgrade of the county to become the New Taipei municipality on 25 December 2010, Shiding became a district.

Geography
Area: 144.35 km2
Population: 7,262 people (February 2023)

Education 
Huafan University
New Taipei Municipal ShiDing High School

Tourist attractions
 Huafan Culture Gallery
 Lumantan Forest Bath
 Putty Painting House
 Shiding Danlan Culture Hall
 Shiding East Street
 Shiding West Street

Transportation
The district is accessible by bus from Jingmei Station of Taipei Metro.

References

External links

  

Districts of New Taipei